Provincial elections will be  held in Vojvodina before 2024 to elect members of the Assembly of Vojvodina, alongside local elections in most municipalities of Serbia.

Background 
In the 2020 Vojvodina provincial election populist Serbian Progressive Party, which has been the ruling party in Vojvodina since 2016, won a majority of Seats. Only 20 deputies in the Vojvodina assembly are in the opposition, due to a boycott by most opposition parties.

Electoral system 
The 120 members of the Assembly are elected by closed-list proportional representation from a single provincial constituency. Seats are allocated using the d'Hondt method with an electoral threshold of 3% of all votes cast (lowered from 5% at the previous elections) although the threshold is waived for ethnic minority parties.

References

Elections in Vojvodina
21st century in Vojvodina